Jim Lind (born November 11, 1947) is a former American football player and coach.  He served as the head football coach at the University of Minnesota Morris from 1983 to 1986 and at the University of Wisconsin–Eau Claire from 1987 to 1991, compiling a career college football record of 42–43–4.

Lind served in the United States Navy before attending Bemidji State University, where he played football and received a physical education and health degree in 1973.  He coached the football and wrestling teams at Underwood High School in Minnesota after receiving his degree. As the head football coach at the University of Minnesota, Morris, he coached the team to an NIC co-championship in 1984 and an NIC championship in 1986.  He was named NIC Coach of the year in 1984 and NAIA District 13 Coach of the Year in 1986.  He later served as the head coach at the University of Wisconsin–Eau Claire.  He was an assistant coach with the Green Bay Packers from 1992 to 1998.  In 1999, Lind moved with Packers' head coach Mike Holmgren to the Seattle Seahawks.

Head coaching record

College

References

External links
 Seattle Seahawks profile

1947 births
Living people
American football defensive backs
American football linebackers
Bemidji State Beavers football players
Bethel Royals football players
BYU Cougars football coaches
Green Bay Packers coaches
Minnesota Morris Cougars football coaches
Saint John's Johnnies football coaches
Seattle Seahawks coaches
St. Cloud State Huskies football coaches
Wisconsin–Eau Claire Blugolds football coaches
High school football coaches in Minnesota
United States Navy sailors
Brigham Young University alumni
St. Cloud State University alumni
People from Mille Lacs County, Minnesota
Players of American football from Minnesota